Mangyshlak or Mangghyshlaq Peninsula is a large peninsula located in western Kazakhstan. It borders on the Caspian Sea in the west and with the Buzachi Peninsula, a marshy sub-feature of the main peninsula, in the northeast. The Tyuleniy Archipelago lies off the northern shores of the peninsula.

The area is between desert and semidesert with a harsh continental dry climate. There are no rivers and no fresh water springs. Geologically, the Mangyshlak Peninsula is part of the Ustyurt Plateau. To the north, three mountain ranges stretch across the peninsula, the North and South Aktau Range and the Mangystau Range, with the highest point reaching 555 m. Administratively, the peninsula is in Kazakhstan's Mangystau Province. The largest city, and the capital of the province, is Aktau (formerly Shevchenko).

This peninsula was formerly also known as Sīāhkūh (Persian: سیاهکوه) which means 'Black Mountain' in Persian. The Mangyshlak peninsula was overtaken in 1639 by Kalmyks. The peninsula's name stems from Ming Qishlaq, which means "1000 winter encampments" in Turkic languages.

Cartography
The area was mapped by Fedor Ivanovich Soimonov during the Caspian Expedition, which surveyed the Caspian Sea from 1719 to 1727.

Sources

External links
 The wildlife of Mangyshlak 
 Kazakhstan Nuclear Facilities: Mangyshlak Atomic Energy Combine at the site of the Nuclear Threat Initiative.

Peninsulas of Kazakhstan
Turkic toponyms